Stari Petlykivtsi is a village in Chortkiv Raion (district) of Ternopil Oblast (province) in western Ukraine. It belongs to Buchach urban hromada, one of the hromadas of Ukraine. 1065 inhabitants lived in the village in 2007.

History 
The first written mention of the village comes from the 15th century. At that time it belonged to the Polish–Lithuanian Commonwealth. From 1772 until 1918 it belonged to the Austrian (Habsburg monarchy, Austrian Empire, Austria-Hungary) empires, and in 1918-1919 it belonged to the West Ukrainian People's Republic. Since 1991 it has belonged to Ukraine.

A reading room of Ukrainian society Prosvita operated in the village.

Until 18 July 2020, Stari Petlykivtsi belonged to Buchach Raion. The raion was abolished in July 2020 as part of the administrative reform of Ukraine, which reduced the number of raions of Ternopil Oblast to three. The area of Buchach Raion was merged into Chortkiv Raion.

Attractions 
 Church of St. Dmytro (1875, reconstr. 1991)
 Chapel with statue of Holy Virgin Mary
 Roman Catholic Church
 Symbolic grave in place re disposal of warriors of Ukrainian Insurgent Army (1996)

Notable Persons
 Innocent Lotocky

References

Sources

External links 

 Stari Petlykivtsi, google maps

Villages in Chortkiv Raion